The 2006 United States House of Representatives elections in Alabama were held on November 7, 2006, to determine the representation of the state of Alabama in the United States House of Representatives. the winning candidates will serve a two-year term from January 3, 2007, to January 3, 2009. The primary elections were held on Tuesday, June 6, 2006.

Overview

District 1

In this staunchly conservative district based in the Gulf Coast region of Alabama, incumbent Republican Congressman Jo Bonner easily dispatched with his Democratic challenger, Vivian Sheffield Beckerle, receiving nearly seventy percent of the vote to win a third term in Congress.

District 2

Seeking an eighth term in Congress, incumbent Republican Congressman Terry Everett trumped the Democratic nominee, Chuck James, in this very conservative district based in the suburbs of Montgomery and southeastern Alabama with almost seventy percent of the vote, securing what would be Everett's last term in Congress before retiring.

District 3

This district, stretching from north to south on the eastern edge of Alabama, is Republican-leaning, but not so much as the other Republican-controlled districts. In that spirit, incumbent Republican Congressman Mike D. Rogers, seeking a third term in Congress, was re-elected over Democratic opponent Greg Pierce and independent challenger Mark Layfield, albeit by the thinnest margin of any member of the Alabama congressional delegation.

District 4

In this north Alabama district, the fifth-most conservative in the United States, incumbent Republican Congressman Robert Aderholt won a sixth term in Congress over Democratic nominee Barbara Bobo, defeating her with over seventy percent of the vote.

District 5

This district, found on the northernmost edge of Alabama, had not elected a Republican to Congress since Reconstruction, despite its strong proclivity towards Republican candidates at the national level and the socially conservative views of its residents. Long-time incumbent Democratic Congressman Bud Cramer had an especially easy time seeking a ninth term in Congress with no opponents.

District 6

This district, considered by the Cook Partisan Voting Index to be the most conservative congressional district in the country, owes its strong allegiance to Republicans to tapping the highly conservative residents of the Birmingham suburbs. To that effect, incumbent Republican Congressman Spencer Bachus won an eighth term in Congress with no opponents.

District 7

Incumbent Democratic Congressman Artur Davis sought a third term in this very liberal district that is mainly rooted in western Alabama but reaches into some portions of Birmingham. This is the most liberal and only majority-black district in Alabama, and as such, Davis won his third term with no opponents.

References

Alabama

2006
2006 Alabama elections